The Sub is an American short horror film directed by Dan Samiljan, co-written by Dave Cain and Samiljan, and produced by Justin Wagman and Noelle Hubbell. The film stars Zoe Jarman, Heather Langenkamp and Brian Stepanek. The film had a successful Kickstarter campaign.

Plot 
Mae Zalinski is a 20-something girl who reluctantly takes a job as a substitute teacher at her old rival high school. Mae has her first day as things go from bad to worse as she starts to uncover the strange, possibly evil underbelly of this seemingly perfect high school. From the odd, overly-friendly vice-principal to the Children-of-the-Corn-esque students, Mae is soon in way over her head.

Cast 
 Zoe Jarman as Mae Zalinski 
 Heather Langenkamp as Senora Babcock
 Brian Stepanek as Coach Forte
 Robbi Morgan as Miss Gormley
 Carrie Wampler as Becky Cumberdale
 Kylee Russell as Penny Petzinger
 John Balma as Mr. Shipley

Possible feature length film 
According to the film's Kickstarter campaign, if the short film garners an audience then it could possibly be made into a feature-length film at some point in the future.

References

External links 
 

2017 films
2017 horror films
American comedy horror films
American horror short films
American comedy short films
2010s comedy horror films
2017 comedy films
2010s English-language films
2010s American films